The King cobra is the world's longest venomous snake.

King Cobra may also refer to:

Fictional characters
 Cobra (Marvel Comics)
 Kobra (DC Comics)
 A British superhero appearing in The Hotspur

Movies
 King Cobra (1999 film), a 1999 horror film
 King Cobra (2016 film), a 2016 biographical crime-drama film

Other
 King Cobra, a variety of lager beer produced by British beer company Cobra Beer
 King Cobra (malt liquor), a brand of malt liquor
 King Cobra (roller coaster), a roller coaster at Kings Island
 King Cobra (ride), a water slide at Six Flags Hurricane Harbor
 Colt King Cobra, a firearm
 Bell 309 King Cobra, a prototype attack helicopter
 P-63 Kingcobra, a Second World War fighter aircraft
 King Kobra, a 1980s hard rock band
 King Cobras (gang), a gang in New Zealand
 King Cobra, a professional wrestler from United States Wrestling Association